Malkajgiri Junction railway station (station code: MJF) is a railway station in Hyderabad, Telangana, India. It is a hub of commuter rail in Secunderabad Urban railway. Localities like Malkajgiri and Anandbagh are accessible from this station.

Services
Malkajgiri railway station is well served with some passenger trains that operate on Secunderabad–Manmad line. Even a couple of Express trains halt here. They are:
 Kacheguda–Narker Express
 Krishna Express
 Ajanta Express
 Ajmer–Hyderabad Express
 Dr. Ambedkar Nagar (Mhow)–Yesvantpur Weekly Express
 Chennai–Nagarsol Express
 Yesvantpur–Lucknow Express (via Kacheguda)
 Yesvantpur–Jabalpur Superfast Express
 Guntur–Kacheguda AC Double Decker Express

There is also a proposal to halt four more express trains in this station due to increasing demands. The Seetaphalmandi–Malkajgiri chord line which was proposed was commenced its services from 2007. By this the commuters of SB line will be able to be connected with the rest of Hyderabad Multi-Modal Transport System directly. The line is electrified.

Lines
Hyderabad Multi-Modal Transport System 
Secunderabad–Bolarum route (SB Line)
Malkajgiri–Moula Ali–Kazipet

Future
Due to a rapid rise in rail transport in Hyderabad, the Railway Board (India) had decided of a fourth railway terminal in addition to the existing ones at Secunderabad railway station, Kacheguda railway station and Hyderabad railway station. The Hyderabad division proposed the Malkajgiri railway station as the fourth rail terminal in Hyderabad. Even if the Railway Board does not consider the proposal of the Hyderabad division's bid for Malkajgiri as the fourth terminal, passengers of the division can benefit since the existing station at Malkajgiri willsoon be transformed into a passenger terminal at an estimated cost of Rs.1 crore. Besides proposing the Malkajgiri station for the fourth terminal, the board is determined to transform the station into a passenger terminal at an estimated cost of Rs. 1 crore. Once the station transforms into a terminus, trains bound to Delhi from Bangalore and Mumbai could pass through the station without touching Secunderabad.

See also
Secunderabad railway station
South Central Railway
Hyderabad Multi-Modal Transport System

References

External links

MMTS stations in Ranga Reddy district
Hyderabad railway division
Railway junction stations in Telangana